Wedel is a surname with different etymologies. It can be derived from the town Wedel in Schleswig-Holstein or from other places in Germany called Wedel. It can also be a name spelled Wedel or Vedel derived from Old Danish wæthel, meaning ford. For example Vedel or Wedel is an older spelling of the name of the city Vejle, and was taken as a surname by many people from the area.

The name may refer to:

 Dieter Wedel (1939–2022), German director
 Erich Rüdiger von Wedel (1892-1954), German flying ace
 Georg Wolfgang Wedel (1645–1721), German professor of botany, chemistry and medicine
 George Wedel (1900–1981), English cricketer
 Hasso von Wedel (aviator) (1893-1945), German flying ace
 Hasso von Wedel (general) (1898-1961), German general during World War II
 Hedda von Wedel (born 1942), German politician (CDU)
 Janine R. Wedel, American anthropologist
 Jerrold von Wedel (1921–1963), American heart surgeon
 Johann Adolph Wedel (1675–1747), German professor of medicine
 Karol Wedel (1813–1902), German Polish confectioner
 Matt Wedel, American paleontologist
 Michel Wedel, American professor of consumer science
 Mildred Mott Wedel (1912–1995), American scholar of Great Plains archaeology and ethnohistory
 Waldo Rudolph Wedel (1908–1996), American archaeologist

See also
 Wedel family